Gaddaar is a 1995 Indian Hindi-language action drama film directed by Deepak Sareen and produced by Sunanda R. Shetty. It stars Sunil Shetty, Sonali Bendre and Harish Kumar in pivotal roles.

Plot
The story is about two close friends who have studied together and spent a lot of time with each other. The real drama stars when the two fall in love with the same girl.

Cast
Suniel Shetty as Sunil 'Sunny' Gujral
Sonali Bendre as Priya
Harish Kumar as Vijay Saxena
Kiran Kumar as Professor Nag
Mohan Joshi as Mr. Gujral, Sunny's father.
Alok Nath as Amar Nath, Priya's father.
Reema Lagoo as Mrs. Saxena, Vijay's mother.
Anant Mahadevan as Mr. Saxena, Vijay's father.
Mahesh Anand as Arjun

Soundtrack
The Soundtrack released on Oct 1994. This marked the debut of Zubeen Garg as a playback singer. Apart from him, other singers like Kumar  Sanu, Alka Yagnik, Udit Narayan, Sapna Mukherjee, Bali Brahmbhatt, Babu Supriyo, Sonu Nigam and Sadhana Sargam were lending their voice.

References

External links

1990s Hindi-language films
1995 films
Films scored by Nadeem–Shravan
Films scored by Surinder Sodhi
Remakes of Indian films
Films directed by Deepak Sareen
Indian action drama films